William Tang may refer to:

William Tang (fashion designer) (born 1959), Hong Kong fashion designer
William Tang (video game designer), author of the Horace computer game series
William Tang, former guitarist of the Hong Kong rock band Beyond